E. Jayne Mockler is a Democratic politician from the state of Wyoming who currently serves as the Chairwoman of the Wyoming Board of Equalization. Prior to first being appointed to the Board in 2013 by Governor Matt Mead, Mockler served as a member of the Wyoming Legislature from Cheyenne, serving in the House of Representatives from 1993 to 1997, and in the Senate from 1997 to 2009. She was the Democratic nominee for Secretary of State in 1998 and a candidate for Mayor of Cheyenne in 2008.

References

External links
Wyoming Board of Equalization
Wyoming State Legislature - E. Jayne Mockler Legislator Profile
Wyoming State Legislature - Senator E. Jayne Mockler
Project Vote Smart - Senator E. Jayne Mockler (WY) profile
Follow the Money - E. Jayne Mockler
2006 2004 2000 1996 Senate campaign contributions
1994 1992 1990 House campaign contributions

Democratic Party Wyoming state senators
Democratic Party members of the Wyoming House of Representatives
1957 births
Living people
Women state legislators in Wyoming
People from Jackson, Wyoming
Wellesley College alumni
21st-century American women